Tang Jing may refer to:

 Tang Ching or Tang Jing (唐菁; born 1924), Chinese/Taiwanese actor, winner of Golden Horse Award for Best Actor
 Tang Jing (footballer) (唐京; born 1975), Chinese professional footballer
 Tang Jing (judoka) (born 1995), Chinese judoka